NFL Pro League Football is a video game developed and first published in 1989 by American studio Micro Sports for DOS.

Gameplay
NFL Pro League Football is an American football game that has a statistical model that enables the player to replay entire NFL regular seasons.

Reception
Win Rogers reviewed the game for Computer Gaming World, and stated that "It will keep flawless records for a fantasy league. Those who live and die by statistics in a football simulation could not ask for more."

Next Generation reviewed the PC version of the game, rating it three stars out of five, and stated that "Micro Sports either needs to stay simple or partner up with someone who has more graphic experience."

Reviews
PC Gamer (Oct, 1995)
Computer Gaming World (Jan, 1996)
PC Player - May, 1994

References

1989 video games
DOS games
DOS-only games
American football video games
Video games developed in the United States